Joanna Louise Coles (born 20 April 1962) was chief content officer for Hearst Magazines from 2016 to 2018.

She has won awards for journalism, including, when she was editor-in-chief, Cosmopolitan’s a national magazine award, for a guide to contraception. She won a Matrix Award for Women in Communication in 2013 (where she was introduced by Florida Congresswoman Val Demings), and was named an Editor of the Year by Adweek. 

Born in the United Kingdom, Coles graduated from the University of East Anglia with a bachelor of arts in English and American literature before starting her career at The Spectator. She moved to the United States in 1997 to become bureau chief of The Guardian, and she later joined The Times.

In 2006, she joined Hearst as editor-in-chief of Marie Claire magazine, then Cosmopolitan (2012-2016), before becoming the company's chief content officer in 2016.

Coles’ foray into television began with the Style network's Running in Heels, which she co-created and executive produced; she was a mentor on Project Runway: All-Stars and executive produced the E! reality series So Cosmo, in which she also appeared on camera. She is an executive producer for The Bold Type, a scripted series airing on Freeform (formerly known as ABC Family) and Hulu.

She is on the boards of Snap, the parent company of Snapchat;  Sonos, Density Software and the clean beauty company Blue Mistral. She is the author of Love Rules, published by HarperCollins; the book was optioned for TV by ABC Signature and FX. In 2019, she signed a first-look deal with ABC Studios. She currently resides in New York City. She has two sons with Peter Godwin.

Early life 
Joanna Coles was born in Otley, West Yorkshire in 1962. Her mother was a medical social worker and her father was a teacher. Much of her family still resides in Yorkshire.

In 1972 at the age of 10, Coles had her first article published in the children's section of the Yorkshire Post.

She attended Prince Henry's Grammar School, Otley, the University of East Anglia and graduated with a degree in English and American Literature.

Journalism career 
Joanna Coles began her career in 1984 on The Spectator. In 1987, she started work as a reporter for The Daily Telegraph, before moving to the staff at The Guardian in 1989. In 1993, so co-created, wrote and presented BBC Radio 4's "Mediumwave," a live weekly radio show about the media; and wrote and presented Late Media, the TV version on BBC2.

Move to New York 
In June 1997, Coles moved to the United States to be The Guardian's New York bureau chief.

Editorships 
Coles was the articles editor of New York Magazine from 2001 to 2004 before becoming executive editor of More.

Hearst 
In 2006, Coles made the move to Hearst to become editor-in-chief of Marie Claire magazine. Under her leadership, the magazine produced its most successful issue in September 2012, while also launching two extensions (Marie Claire@Work, and the Women on Top Awards). She was named Adweek's 2011 Editor of the Year for her work. During this time, Coles began her foray into television with a show called Running in Heels about Marie Claire interns, as well as appearing on Lifetime's Emmy-winning show Project Runway.

Coles was appointed as editor-in-chief of Cosmopolitan magazine in 2012. Though she only had oversight of the print platform, the digital team made Cosmo a leader in the media landscape by partnering with Snapchat to produce daily Cosmo content on the discover platform. She later joined the board of Snap Inc., the parent company of Snapchat. She also brought the brand to television, executive producing the E! reality series So Cosmo. In 2013 she ran a 20-page excerpt of Lean In. Coles turned the magazine away from its "pleasing your man" approach towards women's empowerment.

Coles hosts an annual holiday lunch for 120 top women in media.

In 2016, it was announced that Joanna Coles would become Hearst's first chief content officer. She described her responsibility as CCO as “thinking the way we produce content.” In 2018, after 12 years at Hearst, she exited the company after being passed over for the title of president of the magazine division.

Television

Running In Heels 
Coles' first TV project launched when she arrived at Hearst as editor-in-chief of Marie Claire, where she co-created and executive produced Running in Heels, a reality show that followed three interns working at the magazine.

So Cosmo 
The series was announced in December 2016, with Coles as an executive producer as well as appearing on camera. So Cosmo followed the personal and professional lives of several staff members of Cosmopolitan.

The Bold Type 
Continuing the trend of Cosmo-focused shows, in 2017, The Bold Type premiered on Freeform, of which she is an executive producer.

The show has been nominated for three Teen Choice Awards, a Satellite Award, an Imagen Award, and a GLAAD Media Award.

Disney platforms   
In April 2019, Joanna Coles signed a two-year first-look deal with ABC Studios. In the announcement, it was said that "under the pact, the former CCO will be developing and executive producing projects for multiple platforms with focus on streaming and cable."

Other ventures

Women's empowerment 
Joanna Coles is an advocate for women in media and the business world. She sits on the board of Women's Entrepreneurs New York City, an initiative to expand female entrepreneurship with a focus on underserved women and communities.

Boards 
Coles is on the boards of public companies Snap Inc. and Sonos, the non-profit Women's entrepreneurs NYC, and private companies such as Grover, Density and Blue Mistral.

Published works 
Coles, Joanna. Love Rules: How To Find a Real Relationship in a Digital World. HarperCollins, 2018. https://www.harpercollins.com/9780062652584/love-rules/

References

1960 births
Living people
Alumni of the University of East Anglia
Fashion editors
Cosmopolitan (magazine) editors
Officers of the Order of the British Empire
People educated at Prince Henry's Grammar School, Otley